Wilson County is the name of four counties in the United States:

Wilson County, Kansas
Wilson County, North Carolina
Wilson County, Tennessee
Wilson County, Texas